Six-Shooter Justice is a 1917 American Western film featuring Harry Carey.

Plot
As described in a film magazine review, John Gregg (Witting) and his daughter Mary (Du Brey) become lost and accept the guidance of Miguel Hernandez (Steele), a good-looking bad man. Mary takes a liking to the bad man and will have nothing to do with Cheyenne Harry (Carey), a bad-looking good man. Miguel robs John of his gold and takes Mary to Burro Springs. Henry follows and kills Miguel to protect Mary, and takes John's gold off the body of Miguel. Mary realizes that looks can be deceiving.

Cast
 Harry Carey as Cheyenne Harry
 Claire Du Brey as Mary Gregg, the Prospector's Daughter
 William Steele as Miguel Hernandez (as William Gettinger)
 A. E. Witting - John Gregg as the Prospector (as Arthur Witting)

See also
 Harry Carey filmography

References

External links
 

1917 films
1917 Western (genre) films
American silent short films
American black-and-white films
Films directed by Fred Kelsey
1917 short films
Silent American Western (genre) films
1910s American films